Kim Jung-gu (born March 6, 1990), known professionally as R. Tee, is a South Korean record producer, songwriter, and DJ signed with The Black Label. He has produced songs for artists including Big Bang, Blackpink, iKon, and Winner.

Early life 
Kim Jung-gu was born on March 6, 1990 (February 10, 1990 by the lunar calendar). He liked Radiohead when he was young, so he felt happy when he saved money and bought a Radiohead T-shirt. Later, he wanted to be always happy no matter what music he did, so he shortened "Radiohead T-shirt" into "R.Tee" and began to use it as his stage name. He became interested in electronica after watching Deadmau5 perform. He studied Korean painting in college.

Career 
In 2014, R.Tee released his debut single "We Got the World". In 2015, he appeared on the DJ competition TV show Headliner. He signed to Dee Company, an entertainment agency founded by Yoon Do-hyun. In 2019, he released the single "What Are You Waiting For" with Anda, which received critical acclaim. In 2022, he appeared on Show Me the Money 11 as judge and producer.

Discography

Singles

Songwriting and production credits 
Credits are adapted from the Korean Music Copyright Association database. R. Tee's search ID is 10000790.

Filmography

Television

References

External links
 

1990 births
Living people
South Korean record producers
South Korean songwriters